John McAulay,  (27 December 1888 – 14 January 1956) was a Scottish policeman, soldier and recipient of the Victoria Cross, the highest award for gallantry in the face of the enemy that can be awarded to British and Commonwealth forces.

Early life

He was born in Kinghorn in Fife on 27 December 1888 the son of John McAulay and his wife Isabella. The family moved to 4 Gillespie Crescent in Plean (near Falkirk) and he was educated at Plean Primary School. He left school around 1901 and began working as a coal-miner. Being both tall and strong he left the pits to join the police force in 1911 and was based in Glasgow. At the onset of the First World War he was one of the first volunteers and joined the Scots Guards on 9 September 1914.

Details
He was 28 years old, and a sergeant in the 1st Battalion, Scots Guards, British Army during the First World War when the following deed took place at the Battle of Cambrai for which he was awarded the VC.

On 27 November 1917 at Fontaine Notre Dame, France, when all his officers had become casualties, Sergeant McAulay assumed command of the company and under shell and machine-gun fire successfully held and consolidated the objectives gained. He reorganised the company and noticing a counter-attack developing, repulsed it by the skilful and bold use of machine-guns, causing heavy enemy casualties. The sergeant also carried his company commander, who was mortally wounded, to a place of safety.

After the war he resumed his career in the Glasgow Police, serving in the Maryhill district, rising to the rank of Inspector before retiring in 1948.

He died at home, 915 Aikenhead Road, Burnside, Glasgow on 14 January 1956 and is buried in New Eastwood Cemetery in Glasgow (section L-VII lair 139.

Family

He was married to Catherine Thomson (1890-1963).

Freemasonry
He was Initiated into Freemasonry in Lodge Greyfriars No.1221, (Glasgow, Scotland) on 13 May 1924.

Medal
His Victoria Cross is displayed at The Guards Regimental Headquarters (Scots Guards RHQ), London.

References

External links
Location of grave and VC medal (Glasgow)
News Item (photo)

1888 births
1956 deaths
People from Kinghorn
British World War I recipients of the Victoria Cross
Scots Guards soldiers
British Army personnel of World War I
Recipients of the Distinguished Conduct Medal
Scottish police officers
British Army recipients of the Victoria Cross

Officers in Scottish police forces